James Hong (born 1929) is an American actor.

James Hong may also refer to:

James Hong, co-founder of the online ratings site Hot or Not
James T. Hong, Taiwanese-American filmmaker
James Won-Ki Hong (born 1959), business executive